The 31st ADAC Rallye Deutschland was the ninth round of the 2013 World Rally Championship, held from 22 to 25 August, 2013. Dani Sordo emerged victorious in his first ever WRC victory.

Results

Event standings 

 - The Junior WRC contests only the first 14 stages of the rally.

Special Stages

Power Stage 
The "Power Stage" was a 24.58 km (15.27 mi) stage at the end of the rally.

Standings after the rally 

Drivers' Championship standings

Manufacturers' Championship standings

Other 

WRC-2 Drivers' Championship standings

WRC-3 Drivers' Championship standings

JWRC Drivers' Championship standings

References 
 ADAC Rallye Deutschland 2013 - juwra.com
 31. ADAC Rallye Deutschland 2013 - ewrc-results.com

2013 World Rally Championship season
Rallye Deutschland
2013 in German motorsport